Portswood railway station served the suburb of Portswood, Hampshire, England from 1861 to 1866 on the South West Main Line.

History 
The station opened on 1 May 1861 by the London and South Western Railway. It was situated near the modern A3035 bridge, although it is unclear whether it was north or south of the station. The station closed on 5 March 1866 to make way for the new station that was opening 400m south, which is known as St Denys railway station nowadays. The station opened as Portswood and the name was changed to St Denys in 1876.

References

External links 

Disused railway stations in Southampton
Disused railway stations in Hampshire
Former London and South Western Railway stations
Railway stations in Great Britain opened in 1861
Railway stations in Great Britain closed in 1866
1861 establishments in England
1866 disestablishments in England